Wir 3 (en. We three) was the German version of the popular Belgian-Dutch girl group K3.

History

Stemming from the success of K3 in the Netherlands and Belgium, in 2007 Studio 100 decided to make a similar band to it abroad. In the end, Germany was picked as the place of origin for this new band due to its size and the similarities between the German and Dutch languages.

Ten years later, the name of the band (after translation) and the experience of the creators were used to create a similar band My3 in neighboring Poland.

Members
Similarly to K3 and My3, Wir 3 had 3 female members: 
Lina Sasnauskaite
Linda Hesse
Vera Huebner

Media
 Since 2008: Die Welt von Wir 3 (aired on Super RTL, produced by Studio 100)

Discography

Singles

Albums

Sources
  (Dutch)
  (Dutch)
  (German)
  (German)
  (German)
  (Dutch)
  (Dutch)

German musical trios